Ralf Rocchigiani (born 13 February 1963) is a boxer from Duisburg-Hamborn in Germany. He is the older brother of former two-division world champion of boxing, Graciano Rocchigiani.

He became a professional boxer in 1983 and won the German Cruiserweight championship in 1985.   He failed in two attempts to win the European Boxing Union Light Heavyweight championships.  He also failed to take the WBO Cruiserweight championship from Tyrone Booze in 1992.

He finally won the WBO Cruiserweight championship on June 10, 1995, and held it for more than two years.   He won the vacant title by scoring a technical knockout over Carl Thompson and defended it six times.  He lost the title in a rematch with Thompson in 1997 and retired from boxing in 1999.  Rocchigiani was contractually signed to German boxing promoter Klaus-Peter Kohl and his company "Universum Boxpromotions." He was trained by Fritz Sdunek.

Today Ralf Rocchigiani owns a bar on the Savignyplatz in Berlin and also served as a trainer for his brother Graciano Rocchigiani.

Professional boxing record

|-
|align="center" colspan=8|42 Wins (17 knockouts, 25 decisions), 9 Losses (0 knockouts, 9 decisions), 7 Draws 
|-
| align="center" style="border-style: none none solid solid; background: #e3e3e3"|Result
| align="center" style="border-style: none none solid solid; background: #e3e3e3"|Record
| align="center" style="border-style: none none solid solid; background: #e3e3e3"|Opponent
| align="center" style="border-style: none none solid solid; background: #e3e3e3"|Type
| align="center" style="border-style: none none solid solid; background: #e3e3e3"|Round
| align="center" style="border-style: none none solid solid; background: #e3e3e3"|Date
| align="center" style="border-style: none none solid solid; background: #e3e3e3"|Location
| align="center" style="border-style: none none solid solid; background: #e3e3e3"|Notes
|-align=center
|Win
|
|align=left| Andreas Wornowski
|TKO
|6
|18 Sep 1999
|align=left| Rostock, Mecklenburg-Vorpommern, Germany
|align=left|
|-
|Win
|
|align=left| Andreas Wornowski
|PTS
|8
|6 Dec 1998
|align=left| Prague, Czech Republic
|align=left|
|-
|Loss
|
|align=left| Carl "Cat" Thompson
|SD
|12
|4 Oct 1997
|align=left| Hannover, Niedersachsen, Germany
|align=left|
|-
|Win
|
|align=left| Stefan Angehrn
|MD
|12
|26 Apr 1997
|align=left| Zurich, Switzerland
|align=left|
|-
|Win
|
|align=left| Stefan Angehrn
|UD
|12
|13 Dec 1996
|align=left| Hannover, Niedersachsen, Germany
|align=left|
|-
|Win
|
|align=left| Bash Ali
|UD
|12
|13 Jul 1996
|align=left| Essen, Nordrhein-Westfalen, Germany
|align=left|
|-
|Win
|
|align=left| Jay Snyder
|TKO
|4
|16 Mar 1996
|align=left| Charlottenburg, Berlin, Germany
|align=left|
|-
|Win
|
|align=left| "Pastor" Dan Ward
|TKO
|8
|25 Nov 1995
|align=left| Braunschweig, Niedersachsen, Germany
|align=left|
|-
|Win
|
|align=left| Marc Randazzo
|UD
|12
|30 Sep 1995
|align=left| Hannover, Niedersachsen, Germany
|align=left|
|-
|Win
|
|align=left| Carl "Cat" Thompson
|TKO
|11
|10 Jun 1995
|align=left| Manchester, United Kingdom
|align=left|
|-
|Win
|
|align=left| Terrence Wright
|UD
|8
|12 Feb 1995
|align=left| Wandsbek, Hamburg, Germany
|align=left|
|-
|Loss
|
|align=left| Torsten May
|PTS
|10
|7 May 1994
|align=left| Koblenz, Rheinland-Pfalz, Germany
|align=left|
|-
|Win
|
|align=left| Tim "Dark" Knight
|PTS
|8
|5 Feb 1994
|align=left| Charlottenburg, Berlin, Germany
|align=left|
|-
|Draw
|
|align=left| Tony "Phone" Booth
|PTS
|8
|1 May 1993
|align=left| Berlin, Germany
|align=left|
|-
|Win
|
|align=left| David "Psycho" Bates
|PTS
|8
|3 Apr 1993
|align=left| Wandsbek, Hamburg, Germany
|align=left|
|-
|Win
|
|align=left| Rick Enis
|KO
|5
|19 Dec 1992
|align=left| Berlin, Germany
|align=left|
|-
|Win
|
|align=left| Melvin Ricks
|KO
|4
|27 Nov 1992
|align=left| Suhl, Thuringen, Germany
|align=left|
|-
|Loss
|
|align=left| Tyrone Booze
|UD
|12
|2 Oct 1992
|align=left| Charlottenburg, Berlin, Germany
|align=left|
|-
|Win
|
|align=left| Dawud Shaw
|KO
|3
|27 Jun 1992
|align=left| Halle, Saxony-Anhalt, Germany
|align=left|
|-
|Win
|
|align=left| "Big Bad" John Held
|PTS
|10
|25 Apr 1992
|align=left| Berlin, Germany
|align=left|
|-
|Loss
|
|align=left| "Big Bad" John Held
|PTS
|10
|3 Mar 1992
|align=left| Amsterdam, Netherlands
|align=left|
|-
|Loss
|
|align=left| Markus Bott
|PTS
|10
|3 May 1991
|align=left| Mitte, Berlin, Germany
|align=left|
|-
|Loss
|
|align=left| "Big Bad" John Held
|PTS
|8
|16 Feb 1990
|align=left| Wandsbek, Hamburg, Germany
|align=left|
|-
|Win
|
|align=left| "Santa" Klaus Winter
|KO
|3
|1 Dec 1989
|align=left| Mitte, Berlin, Germany
|align=left|
|-
|Loss
|
|align=left| John Emmen
|PTS
|10
|30 Sep 1989
|align=left| Wandsbek, Hamburg, Germany
|align=left|
|-
|Win
|
|align=left| Bernd Kulle
|PTS
|4
|8 Jul 1989
|align=left| Supplingen, Niedersachsen, Germany
|align=left|
|-
|Draw
|
|align=left| Jan Lefeber
|PTS
|12
|8 Apr 1989
|align=left| Berlin, Germany
|align=left|
|-
|Win
|
|align=left| Jan Lefeber
|PTS
|8
|29 Jul 1988
|align=left| Timmendorfer Strand, Schleswig-Holstein, Germany
|align=left|
|-
|Win
|
|align=left| Vedat Akova
|TKO
|2
|12 May 1988
|align=left| Berlin, Germany
|align=left|
|-
|Win
|
|align=left| Marvin Camel
|PTS
|10
|26 Apr 1988
|align=left| Cologne, Nordrhein-Westfalen, Germany
|align=left|
|-
|Draw
|
|align=left| Agamil Yilderim
|PTS
|8
|19 Feb 1988
|align=left| Berlin, Germany
|align=left|
|-
|Win
|
|align=left| Alex Zeh
|KO
|9
|23 Jan 1988
|align=left| Wandsbek, Hamburg, Germany
|align=left|
|-
|Win
|
|align=left| Chisanda Mutti
|PTS
|10
|5 Dec 1987
|align=left| Düsseldorf, Nordrhein-Westfalen, Germany
|align=left|
|-
|Win
|
|align=left| Tommy "Tune" Taylor
|PTS
|8
|30 Oct 1987
|align=left| Mainz, Rheinland-Pfalz, Germany
|align=left|
|-
|Win
|
|align=left| Manfred Jassmann
|PTS
|10
|25 Sep 1987
|align=left| Berlin, Germany
|align=left|
|-
|Draw
|
|align=left| Alex Zeh
|PTS
|10
|27 Feb 1987
|align=left| Wandsbek, Hamburg, Germany
|align=left|
|-
|Loss
|
|align=left| Alex Blanchard
|UD
|12
|3 Oct 1986
|align=left| Berlin, Germany
|align=left|
|-
|Win
|
|align=left| Mladen Grubešić
|KO
|2
|12 May 1986
|align=left| Hamburg, Germany
|align=left|
|-
|Win
|
|align=left| Dragomir Milo Popović
|DQ
|7
|1 Mar 1986
|align=left| Cologne, Nordrhein-Westfalen, Germany
|align=left|
|-
|Win
|
|align=left| Ibelo Moano
|PTS
|8
|20 Dec 1985
|align=left| Rüsselsheim, Hessen, Germany
|align=left|
|-
|Win
|
|align=left| Tom Collins
|PTS
|8
|29 Nov 1985
|align=left| Frankfurt, Hessen, Germany
|align=left|
|-
|Win
|
|align=left| Jose Seys
|SD
|8
|31 Aug 1985
|align=left| Charlottenburg, Berlin, Germany
|align=left|
|-
|Win
|
|align=left| Josef Kossmann
|TKO
|2
|21 Aug 1985
|align=left| Bad Homburg, Hessen, Germany
|align=left|
|-
|Draw
|
|align=left| Manfred Jassmann
|PTS
|10
|10 May 1985
|align=left| Berlin, Germany
|align=left|
|-
|Loss
|
|align=left| Manfred Jassmann
|PTS
|10
|1 Dec 1984
|align=left| Düsseldorf, Nordrhein-Westfalen, Germany
|align=left|
|-
|Draw
|
|align=left| Paul Muyodi
|PTS
|6
|20 Oct 1984
|align=left| Bad Salzuflen, Nordrhein-Westfalen, Germany
|align=left|
|-
|Win
|
|align=left| Trevor Cattouse
|KO
|3
|5 Oct 1984
|align=left| Frankfurt, Hessen, Germany
|align=left|
|-
|Win
|
|align=left| Juan Alberto Barrero
|PTS
|6
|15 Sep 1984
|align=left| Dortmund, Nordrhein-Westfalen, Germany
|align=left|
|-
|Win
|
|align=left| Brahim Ferizovia
|TKO
|3
|22 Jun 1984
|align=left| Munich, Bayern, Germany
|align=left|
|-
|Win
|
|align=left| Mladen Grubešić
|PTS
|6
|8 Jun 1984
|align=left| Baunatal, Hessen, Germany
|align=left|
|-
|Draw
|
|align=left| "Lemon" Liam Coleman
|PTS
|6
|27 Apr 1984
|align=left| Berlin, Germany
|align=left|
|-
|Win
|
|align=left| Mike "The Real" McCoy
|PTS
|6
|13 Apr 1984
|align=left| Hagen, Nordrhein-Westfalen, Germany
|align=left|
|-
|Win
|
|align=left| Francesco Campi
|RTD
|3
|9 Mar 1984
|align=left| Frankfurt, Hessen, Germany
|align=left|
|-
|Win
|
|align=left| Helmut Ulka
|UD
|4
|24 Feb 1984
|align=left| Alsterdorf, Hamburg, Germany
|align=left|
|-
|Win
|
|align=left| Alan Ash
|PTS
|6
|10 Feb 1984
|align=left| Frankfurt, Hessen, Germany
|align=left|
|-
|Win
|
|align=left| Eddie Vandenhouwele
|PTS
|4
|14 Jan 1984
|align=left| Düsseldorf, Nordrhein-Westfalen, Germany
|align=left|
|-
|Win
|
|align=left| Horst Schulze
|TKO
|1
|2 Dec 1983
|align=left| Stuttgart, Baden-Württemberg, Germany
|align=left|
|-
|Win
|
|align=left| Hans Gimborn
|KO
|1
|5 Nov 1983
|align=left| Mannheim, Baden-Württemberg, Germany
|align=left|
|}

See also 

 Notable boxing families

External links 
 

1963 births
Cruiserweight boxers
German sportspeople of Italian descent
Living people
World Boxing Organization champions
Sportspeople from Duisburg
German male boxers